Crypsirina  is a small genus of long-tailed passerine birds in the crow and jay family, Corvidae. The two species are highly arboreal and rarely come to the ground to feed. The generic name is derived from the Greek words kruptō, meaning "to conceal," and rhis or rhinos, meaning "nostrils".

They are:  

The racket-tailed treepie, formerly placed in Dendrocitta, is an all-black Southeast Asian species. The grey and black hooded treepie is endemic to Myanmar.

References 

 
Bird genera
 
Taxa named by Louis Jean Pierre Vieillot